USS Benner (DE-551) was a proposed World War II United States Navy John C. Butler-class destroyer escort that was never built.

Benner was to have been built at the Boston Navy Yard in Boston, Massachusetts, but her construction contract was cancelled on 10 June 1944 before construction could begin.

The name Benner was reassigned to the destroyer USS Benner (DD-807).

References

Navsource Naval History: Photographic History of the U.S. Navy: Destroyer Escorts, Frigates, Littoral Warfare Vessels

John C. Butler-class destroyer escorts
Cancelled ships of the United States Navy